Sumit Ghadigaonkar (born 11 April 1992) is an Indian cricketer. He made his List A debut on 28 December 2019, for Chilaw Marians Cricket Club in the 2019–20 Invitation Limited Over Tournament in Sri Lanka. On his List A debut, he scored a century, and in his next match he scored 99. He made his first-class debut on 7 February 2020, for Chilaw Marians Cricket Club in the 2019–20 Premier League Tournament.

References

External links
 

1992 births
Living people
Indian cricketers
Chilaw Marians Cricket Club cricketers
Place of birth missing (living people)